Leporinus tigrinus is a species of anostomid fish found in the Tocantins River basin in Brazil in South America. This species can reach a length of  SL.

References

Taxa named by Nikolai Andreyevich Borodin
Taxa described in 1929
Fish described in 1929
Anostomidae